Hairkutt is a 2005 documentary film by Curtis Elliott and Ben Scholle.

Plot
The film stars Bryant “HairKutt” Johnson, director Elliott, Maurice Bradley, and Anthony Dorsey as four friends from St. Louis, Missouri, who travel to a remote cabin in the Great Smoky Mountains of Tennessee. Their plan is to spend a week together to help Hairkutt quit his 15-year addiction to heroin.

Hairkutt longs to end his heroin addiction in order to finally care for his daughter and to realize his dream of running his own hair-cutting business. His friends, particularly Curtis Elliott, want to help him, so they travel to a cabin in Tennessee, cover its carpeting with plastic sheeting, and prepare restraining ropes on one of the beds. Hairkutt will attempt to quit cold turkey.

It is stated that 99% of attempts to quit heroin cold turkey are unsuccessful.

The first night unfolds, and the tough love of Hairkutt's friends quickly reaches new depths. He writhes in agony, night after night, and as his friends care for him and joust with him verbally, the question is whether this will be Hairkutt's deathbed or a springboard to a new life.

Cast
 Reese ... Maurice Bradley (himself)
 Lark ... Anthony Dorsey (himself)
 Curtis ... Curtis Elliott (himself)
 HairKutt ... Bryant Johnson (himself)

Format
The cinematography is amateur, yet expertly edited by filmmaker Scholle, and spliced together with interviews with the participants. Subtitle explanations of the story as it unfolds and background on the history of drugs and violence in St. Louis complement the scenes.

Original music by Ben Scholle and Vince Deloney adds texture.

Reception
The film won accolades at several documentary film festivals, including Best Documentary at the St. Louis Filmmakers Showcase and the New York International Independent Film and Video Festival.

External links
 
 

2005 films
American documentary films
Documentary films about drug addiction
Films about heroin addiction
2000s English-language films
2000s American films